Werner Weckert (born 23 August 1938) is a former Swiss cyclist. He competed in the team pursuit at the 1960 Summer Olympics.

References

External links
 

1938 births
Living people
Swiss male cyclists
Olympic cyclists of Switzerland
Cyclists at the 1960 Summer Olympics
Cyclists from Zürich